The Class D level Pennsylvania–Ohio–Maryland League (POM League) began in 1906. By 1908, however, this baseball minor league was extinct. Cumberland, Maryland dropped out after 1906, leaving Maryland unrepresented in 1907. West Virginia was in the loop for about three weeks when Butler moved to Piedmont, West Virginia, but the team moved on to Charleroi, Pennsylvania.

Cities represented 
 Braddock, Pennsylvania: Braddock Infants 1906–1907 
 Butler, Pennsylvania: Butler Bucks 1906 
 Charleroi, Pennsylvania: Charleroi 1906–1907 
 Cumberland, Maryland: Cumberland Giants 1906 
 East Liverpool, Ohio: East Liverpool 1906–1907 
 McKeesport, Pennsylvania: McKeesport Tubers 1907 
 Piedmont, West Virginia: Piedmont 1906 
 Steubenville, Ohio: Steubenville Stubs 1906–1907 
 Uniontown, Pennsylvania: Uniontown Coal Barons 1906–1907 
 Washington, Pennsylvania: Washington 1906–1907 
 Waynesburg, Pennsylvania: Waynesburg 1906 
 Zanesville, Ohio: Zanesville 1907

Standings & statistics

1906 Pennsylvania–Ohio–Maryland League
schedule
Butler (16–16) moved to Piedmont July 14; Piedmont (1–20) Moved to Charleroi August 6. No Playoffs Scheduled.

1907 Pennsylvania–Ohio–Maryland League
schedule 
 No Playoffs Scheduled.

References

History of Cumberland, MD-WV MSA
Sports in Cumberland, Maryland
Baseball leagues in Maryland
Baseball leagues in Pennsylvania
Baseball leagues in Ohio
Defunct minor baseball leagues in the United States
Baseball leagues in West Virginia
1906 establishments in the United States
Sports leagues established in 1906
1907 disestablishments in the United States
Sports leagues disestablished in 1907